Edaphobacter aggregans is a Gram-negative, rod shaped bacterium from the genus Edaphobacter.

References

External links
Type strain of Edaphobacter aggregans at BacDive -  the Bacterial Diversity Metadatabase

Acidophiles

Acidobacteriota
Bacteria described in 2008